The Copa Tres Diamantes is a golf tournament on the Tour de las Americas, the highest level professional golf tour in Latin America. First held in 2006, it has always been held at the Barquisimeto Country Club in Barquisimeto, Venezuela.

Although it has been a fixture on the Tour de las Americas schedule since its inception, it has only been a qualifying event for the Order of Merit since 2008.

Winners

External links
Tour de las Americas – official site

Golf tournaments in Venezuela
Tour de las Américas events
Sport in Barquisimeto
Recurring sporting events established in 2006
2006 establishments in Venezuela